Events from the year 1887 in Sweden

Incumbents
 Monarch – Oscar II
 Prime Minister – Robert Themptander

Events

 - Swedish State Railways established.
 - Swedish Painters' Union founded.
 - Arbetet
 - Old Stockholm telephone tower
 - Örgryte IS
 - First issue of the women's issue Idun (magazine).

Births
 17 February – Nils Granfelt, gymnast (died 1959).
 16 June – Hugo Johansson, sport shooter (died 1977).
 18 December – Algot Lönn, cyclist (died 1953).

Deaths
 7 February – Hanna Brooman, composer, translator and educator (born 1809) 
 Hedvig Willman, actress (born 1841)
 Antoinette Nording, perfume entrepreneur  (born 1814)

References

 
Years of the 19th century in Sweden
Sweden